Eduardo Munniz is a Brazilian actor of TV series and artist. Muniz is well known for Brazil's male voice talents.

Career
Munniz graduated in acting from Michael Howard Studios in New York City. His Bengali debut film is Amazon Obhijaan, sequel of the movie Chander Pahar, directed by Kamaleshwar Mukherjee. Before appearing this Bengali film he directed theater, performed as voice over artist in The Coca-Cola Company's Campaigns, Volkswagen Brasil, Sundance TV, HSBC Bank like commercial programs. Munniz also worked in the advertisement of various companies like Pepsi, Rolling Stone magazine, Vivo, Honda, GM, Ford, Itaipava etc.

References

External links
 

Living people
Brazilian male film actors
Brazilian artists
Year of birth missing (living people)